McGovern may refer to the following:

 McGovern (name), surname of Irish origin
 McGovern Institute for Brain Research

People:
 Jack Michael McGovern current clan Chief b.1989 inherited by right of birth.
 Alison McGovern (b. 1980), British Labour politician 
 Barry McGovern, Irish Actor
 Brian Magauran b.1592 was chief of the McGovern Clan of Tullyhaw, County Cavan from 1622 until his death.
 Brian Mág Samhradháin (anglicised McGovern), chief of the McGovern Clan of Tullyhaw, County Cavan from c.1240 to 1258.
 Brian ‘Breaghach’ Mág Samhradháin (anglicised McGovern), chief of the McGovern Clan of Tullyhaw, County Cavan from 1272 to 3 May 1294.
 Brian Óg Mág Samhradháin (anglicised Brian McGovern Junior) d. 1584, was chief of the McGovern Clan of Tullyhaw, County Cavan until his death in 1584.
 Brian McGovern (footballer), former Irish professional footballer
 Colonel Bryan Magauran, the Sixth, (Gaelic- Brian Mág Samhradháin) was the last chief of the McGovern Clan of Tullyhaw, County Cavan for a brief period at the end of the 17th century.
Cathal Mág Samhradháin, the First, (anglicised Charles McGovern) was chief of the McGovern Clan of Tullyhaw, County Cavan from 1460 until his death in 1478.
 Cathal Mág Samhradháin, the Second, (anglicised Charles McGovern) was chief of the McGovern Clan of Tullyhaw, County Cavan from 1504 until his death in 1512.
 Charles Magauran, the Third, (Gaelic- Cathal Mág Samhradháin) was chief of the McGovern Clan of Tullyhaw, County Cavan including the period 1641 to 1657.
 Cormac Mác Shamhradháin, Bishop of Ardagh 1444-1476
 Des McGovern (1928-2013), Australian rugby league footballer
 Domhnall ‘Bernach’ Mág Samhradháin (anglicised Donal ‘Gap-Tooth’ McGovern) was chief of the McGovern Clan of Tullyhaw, County Cavan from 1495 until his death on 15 February 1496.
 Donnchadh ‘Cime’ Mág Samhradháin (anglicised McGovern), chief of the McGovern Clan of Tullyhaw, County Cavan from 1258 to 1269.
 Éamonn Mág Samhradháin (anglicised Eamon McGovern) was chief of the McGovern Clan of Tullyhaw, County Cavan from 1496 until his death in 1504.
 Edmund MacGauran, Archbishop of Armagh 1587-1593
 Elizabeth McGovern, American film and television actress
 Eóghan Mág Samhradháin (anglicised Owen McGovern) was chief of the McGovern Clan of Tullyhaw, County Cavan from 1458 until his death in 1460.
 Eugene McGovern, former Irish/Munster rugby player
 Fearghal Mág Samhradháin, (anglicised Fergal McGovern) was chief of the McGovern Clan of Tullyhaw, County Cavan from 1359 until his death in 1393.
 Feidhlimidh Mág Samhradháin, the First (anglicised Phelim McGovern) was chief of the McGovern Clan of Tullyhaw, County Cavan from 1478 until his death on 15 February 1495
 Feidhlimidh Mág Samhradháin, the Second, (anglicised Felim McGovern), chief of the McGovern Clan of Tullyhaw, County Cavan from before 1611 until his death on 20 January 1622.
 Francis E. McGovern, Governor of Wisconsin
 George McGovern (1922 - 2012), American politician from South Dakota, 1972 Democratic presidential nominee
 Eleanor McGovern (1921 - 2007), wife of George McGovern
 Giolla Íosa Mág Samhradháin, (d.1231) was chief of the McGovern Clan of Tullyhaw, County Cavan from c.1200 - 1231.
 Giolla na Naomh Mág Samhradháin, the First, was chief of the McGovern Clan of Tullyhaw, County Cavan from c.1160 - 1200.
 J. Raymond McGovern, New York State Comptroller (1951–1954)
 James McGovern (disambiguation), various
 Jim McGovern (American politician), American politician from Massachusetts
 John McGovern (soldier), Victorian Cross recipient
 John McGovern (footballer), Scottish footballer
 John McGovern (politician), Scottish politician
 Jonny McGovern, American stand-up comedian and musician
 Maghnus Mág Samhradháin, the First, (anglicised Manus McGovern) was chief of the McGovern Clan of Tullyhaw, County Cavan from 1294 until his murder in 1299.
 Maghnus 'Ruadh' Mág Samhradháin, the Second, (anglicised ‘Red’ Manus McGovern) was chief of the McGovern Clan of Tullyhaw, County Cavan from 1393 until his murder in 1408.
 Maureen McGovern, American singer
 Michael McGovern (disambiguation), several people
 Muireadhach Mág Samhradhán, (anglicised Murtagh McGovern) was the first person to bear the surname McGovern and was chief of the McGovern Clan of Tullyhaw, County Cavan from c.1120 - 1160.
 Niall Mág Samhradháin, (anglicised Niall McGovern) was chief of the McGovern Clan of Tullyhaw, County Cavan from 1340 until his death in 1359.
 Owen Roe McGovern, former Cavan Gaelic footballer
 Patrick McGovern (disambiguation), various
 Peter McGovern (1927–2006), English songwriter and activist
 Ray McGovern, former CIA agent and member of Veteran Intelligence Professionals for Sanity (VIPS)
 Robert M. McGovern, soldier in the United States Army during the Korean War
 Tomás Mág Samhradháin (anglicised McGovern) was chief of the McGovern Clan of Tullyhaw, County Cavan from 1269 to 1272.
 Tomás Mág Samhradháin the Second, (anglicised Thomas McGovern) was chief of the McGovern Clan of Tullyhaw, County Cavan from before 1325 until his death in 1340.
 Tomás Óg 'na Fésóige' Mág Samhradháin, the Third, (anglicised Thomas McGovern, Junior 'of the beard') was chief of the McGovern Clan of Tullyhaw, County Cavan from 1393 until his death in 1458.
 Tomás Mág Samhradháin, the Fourth (anglicised Thomas McGovern) was chief of the McGovern Clan of Tullyhaw, County Cavan from 1512 until his death in 1532.
 Tomas Óg Mág Samhradháin (anglicised McGovern) was chief of the McGovern Clan of Tullyhaw, County Cavan from 1584 until the end of the 16th century.
 Uaithne Mág Samhradháin (anglicised Owny McGovern) was chief of the McGovern Clan of Tullyhaw, County Cavan from 1540 until his death.
William Montgomery McGovern (1897 - 1964), was possible inspiration for the character of Indiana Jones, as an American anthropologist, journalist, political scientist, and professor.

Places:
 McGovern, Pennsylvania
 Ballymcgovern, Co. Cavan,